The athletics competition at the 2013 Islamic Solidarity Games was held in Jaka Baring Athletic Stadium in Palembang, Indonesia from 25 to 29 September 2013.

It was the first time that women athletes competed at the Games.

Medalists

Men

Women

Medal table

References

External links 
Partial results (archived)
Partial results

2013
Islamic Solidarity Games
2013 Islamic Solidarity Games
2013 Islamic Solidarity Games